Kenny Van Der Schueren (born 20 July 1982 in Zottegem) is a Belgian former road cyclist.

Major results
2007
 1st Triptyque Ardennais
 2nd Kattekoers
 4th De Vlaamse Pijl

References

External links

1982 births
Living people
Belgian male cyclists
People from Zottegem
Cyclists from East Flanders